Howard University Hospital, previously known as Freedmen's Hospital, is a major hospital located in Washington, D.C., built on the site of Griffith Stadium, a former professional baseball stadium that served as the home field of the Washington Senators. The hospital has served the African American community in the Washington metropolitan area since its 1862 founding. 

Following the Civil War, the hospital catered to the medical needs of thousands of African Americans who fled the Southern United States for the Northeast as part of the Great Migration. The first hospital of its kind to provide medical treatment for former slaves, it later became the major hospital for the area's African American community.

Overview
Howard University Hospital (HUH) is a private, nonprofit institution in Washington, D.C. affiliated with Howard University. It is the nation's only teaching hospital on the campus of a historically black university. It offers medical students opportunities to observe and participate in clinical and research work with professionals. 

The 2001 closure of D.C. General Hospital sent the poorest patients there, and by 2016 the financially overburdened hospital had the highest rate of wrongful death lawsuits of any health facility in Washington, D.C. In 2020 the hospital came under the management of Adventist HealthCare, providing new resources and opportunities for clinical training in the network's other facilities.

Physicians and other health professionals are engaged weekly in activities and services in the local community, including medical presentations, free health screenings, educational workshops, and health fairs. HUH's community-based programs include the Diabetes Treatment Center, a facility that service the medical needs of diabetic patients through a multidisciplinary approach to patient care. The Minority Organ Tissue Transplant Education Program (MOTTEP), founded by transplant surgeon Clive O. Callender, is headquartered at Howard University Hospital. Specialized services include endocrinology, ophthalmology, podiatry, diabetes education, pharmacy services and nutrition services. Counseling is tailored to the patient's goals, education and lifestyle.

HUH functions as a Level 1 Trauma Center for the Washington metropolitan area. It handles more than 1,300 admissions annually and became one of the primary trauma centers for District residents after the closure of District of Columbia General Hospital.

HUH trauma leadership includes Dr. Edward E. Cornwell, III, a trauma surgeon, author and community activist who has devoted his career to work in urban communities. His work in the operating room and his outreach to Black males has been featured in Black Enterprise magazine and by ABC News. The Division of Trauma is also noted for the high research productivity of its surgeons, with more than 50 trauma articles published in peer-reviewed journals in the past three years.

HUH, along with the Division of Health Sciences and the Howard University Office of University Communications, publishes a quarterly health newsletter called The Check Up.

History

Freedmen's Hospital 
Freedmen's Hospital and Asylum was first established in 1862 on the grounds of the Camp Barker, 13th and R Streets, NW, and cared for freed, disabled and aged blacks. In 1863, it was placed under the charge of Dr. Alexander Augusta, the first African American to head a hospital in the United States. After the Civil War, it became the teaching hospital of Howard University Medical School, established in 1868, while remaining under federal control.  Prior to 1874 it was run by the Freedmen's Bureau in the U.S. Department of War, and in 1874 it was transferred to the Department of the Interior.

In 1881, Charles Burleigh Purvis was appointed by President Chester Arthur to Surgeon-in-Charge at the Freedmen's hospital. Purvis was Surgeon-in-Charge at the Freedmen's Hospital from October 1, 1881, to 1894, and in that role was the first black person to head a hospital under civilian authority.  During 1883–1905, the hospital was run by the Commissioners of the District of Columbia, but it was returned to the Department of the Interior afterwards.

Early in the 20th century, Congress authorized the construction of a new hospital. It was completed in 1909 on Bryant Street, NW, between 4th and 6th Streets. When Abraham Flexner visited the District of Columbia that year, he was impressed by the new, 278-bed Freedmen's Hospital and thought only Howard University Medical School in the city had a promising future.

In 1940, the hospital was transferred from the Department of the Interior to the U.S. Public Health Service.In 1967, Freedmen's Hospital was transferred to Howard University and used as a hospital until 1975.  The original Freedmen's building on Bryant Street still stands, although it now houses Howard University's John H. Johnson School of Communications. Freedmen's Hall, a permanent museum located at the University Hospital, is devoted to the history of medical education and health care at Howard University.

Modern facility 
The University Hospital is now located in a modern facility at 2041 Georgia Avenue, NW, the former site of Griffith Stadium, the home venue of the Homestead Grays, Washington Senators, and Washington Commanders.

In February 2020, Howard University Hospital and Adventist HealthCare signed an agreement, to have Adventist HealthCare manage the hospital for three years. Anita L. A. Jenkins, former president of Sycamore Medical Center, part of Kettering Health Network, is the hospital's chief executive.

Departments
Howard contains the following departments:
Anesthesiology - The Department of Anesthesiology provides healthcare services to surgical, obstetric and emergency and pain management patients.
Community Health and Family Medicine - The Department of Community Health and Family Medicine provides care —from adult medicine to pediatrics.
Dentistry - The Department of Dentistry provides specialty services to patients, including evaluation and treatment, planning, oral cancer screenings, surgery and more.
Dermatology - The Department of Dermatology offers services in treating diseases of skin, hair and nails. It specializes in dermatological diseases of African Americans and other ethnic groups with dark skin.
Emergency Medicine - The Department of Emergency Medicine provides emergency care.  It receives more than 60,000 patient visits annually.
Internal Medicine--The Department of Internal Medicine deals with the prevention, diagnosis and treatment of adult diseases.
Neurology - The Department of Neurology provides neurological care across a wide range of ailments. It focuses on neurological disorders that primarily affect the African-American population and other minorities.
Obstetrics and Gynecology 
Ophthalmology - The Department of Ophthalmology provides eye care services at one location to patients of all ages.
Orthopaedic Surgery and Rehabilitation - The Department of Orthopaedic Surgery and Rehabilitation offers surgical and nonsurgical treatments of injuries and diseases of the musculoskeletal system: bones, joints, ligaments, tendons, muscles and nerves.
Pathology - The Department of Pathology and its laboratories provide clinical services relating to testing and diagnosing various life-threatening diseases, including cancers of the liver, throat, breast, reproductive system, respiratory system and gastrointestinal tract.
Pediatrics and Child Health - The Department of Pediatrics and Child Health provides services to children and adolescents, including neonatal and nursery services, preventive medicine through immunizations and certifications for school.
Psychiatry and Behavioral Sciences - The Department of Psychiatry and Behavioral Sciences provides services for the diagnosis and treatment of severely mentally ill patients and those with life issues, treatment of the deaf and mentally challenged and the diagnosis and treatment of addictive disorders.  The Mood and Anxiety Behavioral and Neuroscience Center researches ways to prevent post-traumatic stress disorders, treats bipolar illnesses and provides treatment-resistant depression modalities. 
Radiology - The Department of Radiology provides diagnostic imaging services to patients from newborn to geriatric whether they are inpatient or ambulatory.
Surgery - The Department of Surgery provides the complete range of surgical services, including surgical oncology, cardiovascular surgery, urological surgery, podiatry surgery, vascular and endovascular surgery, trauma surgery and neurosurgery.
The New Freedmen's Clinic - In 2009, Howard University Hospital began offering free medical treatment in a new clinic that is designed to care for low-income, uninsured patients. It is run, staffed and funded by medical students from the College of Medicine. Currently serving adults only, it opens weekly on Mondays from 6 p.m. to 9 p.m. Medical students, overseen by attending physicians, treat patients by appointment and those referred by the hospital's Emergency Department as well as a limited number of walk-in patients.

See also
List of former United States Army medical units

References

External links 

Hospital buildings completed in 1862
American Civil War hospitals
Hospitals established in 1862
Closed installations of the United States Army
Closed medical facilities of the United States Army
Hospitals in Washington, D.C.
Washington, D.C., in the American Civil War
1862 establishments in Washington, D.C.
Historically black hospitals in the United States
African-American history of Washington, D.C.
Howard University buildings
United States Marine Hospitals
Trauma centers